Jameh Jameh (1954 – 17 October 2013) was a Syrian Armed Forces major general who held the position of head of military intelligence in Deir ez-Zor Governorate. He was killed by rebels on 17 October 2013, during the Syrian Civil War. He was likely shot by a rebel sniper in the Reshdiya neighbourhood of Deir ez-Zour city.

Career
Jameh was one Syria's senior security officers in Lebanon in the period 1976–2005. He has been accused to have a role in the assassination of former Lebanese Prime Minister Rafic Hariri in 2005. In 2006, he was blacklisted by the US Treasury Department for his role in supporting "terrorist groups" and over the presence in Lebanon.

References

1954 births
2013 deaths
Date of birth missing
Deaths by firearm in Syria
Military personnel killed in the Syrian civil war
People from Jableh
Syrian generals
Syrian military personnel killed in action